The second season of Animated series The Dukes Of Broxstonia first broadcast on ABC3 Australia on 10 January 2011 and ended on 23 January 2012. It contains 10 episodes available as 3 minutes episodes in 1080i HD format. The season began with "Bite Night" and ended with "Larj In Love".

Episode List

2011 Australian television seasons
2012 Australian television seasons